Eubaphe medea is a species of geometrid moth in the family Geometridae. It is found in Central America and North America.

The MONA or Hodges number for Eubaphe medea is 7440.1.

References

Further reading

 
 

Eudulini
Articles created by Qbugbot
Moths described in 1885